Dusklands (1974) is the debut novel by J. M. Coetzee, winner of the 2003 Nobel Prize in Literature. The novel consists of two separate stories, "The Vietnam Project" and "The Narrative of Jacobus Coetzee."

Plot
The first story, "The Vietnam Project", relates the gradual descent into insanity of its protagonist Eugene Dawn. Eugene works for a U.S. government agency responsible for the psychological warfare in the Vietnam War. However, his work on mythography and psychological operations is taking a heavy toll on him; his fall culminates in him stabbing his own son, Martin.

The second story, "The Narrative of Jacobus Coetzee", which takes place in the 18th century, is an account of a hunting expedition into the then "unexplored" interior of South Africa. After crossing the Orange River, Jacobus meets with a Namaqua tribe to trade, but suddenly falls ill. He is attended to by the tribe and gradually recovers, only to get into a fight for which he is expelled from the village. His last slave dying on the way home, he returns alone and later organizes a punitive expedition against the Namaqua. The narrative concludes with his execution of the slaves that deserted him on the previous journey and the massacre of the tribe.

Development history
Coetzee began working on the novel whilst he lived in London. He would visit the British Museum and research accounts of early explorers and travellers within South Africa. When he moved to Texas in the late 1960s he continued to research the subject, but still had not begun writing. Coetzee began writing the novel when he moved to Buffalo, New York, in January 1970. The novel stemmed out of a New Year's resolution to "stop thinking and planning and actually start writing".

Reception
According to the literary critic Dominic Head, who has published two book-length studies on Coetzee, "it has become a truism in criticism of Coetzee that Dusklands introduces a new postmodernist strain in the novel from South Africa." From the time of its initial publication in 1974, it has generally garnered positive responses from readers and critics, many of whom admire its presentation and critique of the violence inherent in the colonialist and imperialist mentality of the Western world. On the other hand, those who've "found fault with Dusklands have tended to concentrate on the obliquity of the book's method: Coetzee is condemned for failing to offer a more direct rejection of the colonial violence he represents."

When Per Wästberg delivered the Presentation Speech at the 2003 Nobel Prize award ceremony, he singled out Dusklands in his talk:

Popular culture
Dusklands is seen in the movie G.I. Jane, being read by Command Master Chief John James Urgayle (portrayed by actor Viggo Mortensen).

Further reading

References

1974 novels
1974 debut novels
20th-century South African novels
Novels by J. M. Coetzee
Novels set in Vietnam
Novels set in South Africa
Secker & Warburg books